Sepulcidae is an extinct family of stem sawflies in the order Hymenoptera. The family is known primarily from late Mesozoic fossils found in 1968 in Transbaikalia. The insects were distant relatives of modern sawflies and are part of the living superfamily Cephoidea.

The genus Sepulca was identified by Alexandr Pavlovich Rasnitsyn. It was named by his colleague and a science-fiction author Kirill Eskov after fictional entities called sepulki, found in Stanisław Lem's The Star Diaries and Observation on the Spot.<ref> Каракоз Роман. Где живут сепульки: [О двух видах палеонтологических перепончатокрылых — Sepulka mirabilis и Sepulenia syricta] // Новая интересная газета (Киев). — 2004. — № 1. — С. 5. — (Блок Z: Просто фантастика). Аннотация
Quote: Оказывается, сепулек, которые оказались вовсе не моллюсками, а перепончатокрылыми насекомыми, открыл Александр Павлович Расницын (кстати, работающий в одной лаборатории с известным писателем Кириллом Еськовым). Он-то и посылал в свое время Лему свою книжку, где, кроме прочего, были описаны Сепулька удивительная (Sepulca mirabilis) и Сепуление со свистом (дословно – свистящее: Sepulenia syricta).</ref> The relation to Lem's sepulki is understandable in both Polish and Russian, but their English translation obscures their association with ancient insects as they are translated as Scrupts in English editions of Lem's novels. 

Genera
These 17 genera belong to the family Sepulcidae:

 Subfamily Sepulcinae Rasnitsyn, 1968
 † Sepulca Rasnitsyn, 1968
 † Sepulenia Rasnitsyn, 1968
 Subfamily Parapamphiliinae Rasnitsyn, 1968
 † Micramphilius Rasnitsyn, 1993
 † Pamparaphilius Rasnitsyn, 1993
 † Parabakharius Rasnitsyn, 1993
 † Parapamphilius Rasnitsyn, 1968
 † Shurabisca Rasnitsyn, 1968
 † Sogutia Rasnitsyn, 1977
 Subfamily Xyelulinae Rasnitsyn, 1993
 † Neoxyelula Rasnitsyn, 1993
 † Onokhoius Rasnitsyn, 1990
 † Xyelula Rasnitzyn, 1969
 Subfamily Trematothoracinae Rasnitsyn, 1988
 † Prosyntexis Sharkey, 1990
 † Thoracotrema Rasnitsyn, 1988
 † Trematothorax Rasnitsyn, 1988 (= Trematothoracoides Zhang, Zhang & Wei, 2001)
 Subfamily Ghilarellinae Rasnitsyn, 1988
 † Ghilarella Rasnitsyn, 1988
 † Meiaghilarella Rasnitsyn & Martinez-Delclos, 2000
 Subfamily incertae sedis † Xaxexis'' Pagliano & Scaramozzino, 1989

References 

†Sepulcidae
Prehistoric insect families
Mesozoic arthropods
Commemoration of Stanisław Lem
Taxa named by Alexandr Rasnitsyn